Stephen LeCharles Randolph (born May 1, 1974) is an American left-handed pitcher formerly in Major League Baseball and Nippon Professional Baseball.

Career
Randolph was selected by the New York Yankees in the 18th round of the 1995 MLB Draft out of the University of Texas, Austin. He spent three seasons in the Yankees farm system, never getting above "A" ball.

In late 1997 he was selected by the Arizona Diamondbacks in the minor league phase of the Rule 5 draft and joined the Diamondbacks farm system, where he would remain through 2003, primarily with the Tucson Sidewinders.

He made his Major League debut on March 31, 2003 for the Diamondbacks against the Los Angeles Dodgers, working 1/3 of an inning in relief. He became a regular contributor to the Arizona bullpen in both 2003 and 2004, pitching in 50 games in 2003 and 45 in 2004.

In January, 2005, Arizona traded him to the Chicago Cubs but the Cubs released him at the end of spring training and he spent the 2005 season with minor league affiliates of the San Francisco Giants and Washington Nationals and the 2006 season with the Charlotte Knights in the Chicago White Sox organization.

On January 4, 2007, he signed a minor league deal with the Houston Astros
and was called up to Houston from Triple-A Round Rock April 25 when reliever Rick White was placed on the disabled list (DL) with an oblique strain. He made only two appearances before he was designated for assignment on April 27 to make room for top outfield prospect Hunter Pence. He was recalled from Round Rock June 19 when Brad Lidge went on the DL with an oblique strain,
but was again designated for assignment June 28.

On December 13, 2007, he was among 89 players named in the Mitchell Report on performance-enhancing drug use in baseball.

On May 8, 2008, Randolph was traded by the Astros to the Philadelphia Phillies. He was assigned to the Phillies' Triple-A affiliate, the Lehigh Valley IronPigs and became a free agent at the end of the season. He signed a minor league contract with the Los Angeles Dodgers in January  and was assigned to the AAA Albuquerque Isotopes. On July 3, the Dodgers traded him to the Kansas City Royals. On July 25, 2009 Randolph was sold to the Yokohama BayStars.

See also
 List of Major League Baseball players named in the Mitchell Report

References

External links

1974 births
Living people
African-American baseball players
Albuquerque Isotopes players
American expatriate baseball players in Japan
Arizona Diamondbacks players
Arizona League Diamondbacks players
Charlotte Knights players
El Paso Diablos players
Fresno Grizzlies players
Galveston Whitecaps baseball players
Greensboro Bats players
Gulf Coast Yankees players
High Desert Mavericks players
Houston Astros players
Lehigh Valley IronPigs players
Major League Baseball pitchers
Major League Baseball players from Japan
New Orleans Zephyrs players
Nippon Professional Baseball pitchers
Omaha Royals players
Oneonta Yankees players
Sportspeople from Okinawa Prefecture
Round Rock Express players
Tampa Yankees players
Texas Longhorns baseball players
Tiburones de La Guaira players
American expatriate baseball players in Venezuela
Tigres de Aragua players
Tucson Sidewinders players
Yokohama BayStars players
21st-century African-American sportspeople
20th-century African-American sportspeople